The Government of Pittsburgh is composed of the Mayor, the City Council, and various boards and commissions. Most of these offices are housed within the Pittsburgh City-County Building. The Government of Pittsburgh receives its authority from the Pennsylvania General Assembly pursuant to Part III of Title 53 of the Pennsylvania Consolidated Statutes, relating to Cities of the Second Class.

Mayor

The Mayor of Pittsburgh is elected every 4 years. The current mayor is Ed Gainey.  Since the 1950s the Mayor's Chief of Staff has assumed a large role in advising, long term planning and as a "gatekeeper" to the mayor.

City Council

The Pittsburgh City Council is a nine-member city council. City council members are chosen by plurality elections in each of nine districts.

Law enforcement
The mayor appoints (with City Council approval) the position of Pittsburgh Police Chief. The city and its immediate suburbs are served by the four-year elected Allegheny County District Attorney to prosecute criminal offenses and the congressionally appointed U.S. District Attorney for the Western District of Pennsylvania for federal offenses. The city and its residents are also served by the elected four-year term Allegheny County Sheriff and the County council-appointed Allegheny County Police Department Chief.

Pittsburgh Intergovernmental Cooperation Authority

Pittsburgh finances are subject to the Pittsburgh Intergovernmental Cooperation Authority, the city's state-appointed financial oversight body.

Boards, Authorities and Commissions
Many governmental functions are carried out by boards, authorities and commissions. These organizations include:

Allegheny County Sanitary Authority
Allegheny Regional Asset District Board
Pittsburgh Parking Authority
Sports and Exhibition Authority
Urban Redevelopment Authority of Pittsburgh
Pittsburgh Stadium Authority

See also
 Government of Pennsylvania

References

External links
 
 Pittsburgh Code and Charter from Municode